The Ulster Cup was an annual football competition held by the Irish Football League for senior clubs.

History
Beginning in 1949, it was held on fifty-one occasions until being suspended after the 1998/99 season and discontinued after a one-off re-appearance in 2002/03.  The last three editions were only open to First Division sides.  From the mid-1980s to the early-1990s the competition was known as the Lombard Ulster Cup due to a sponsorship deal with the Lombard & Ulster Bank. It had previously been sponsored by Morans.

Format
The format of the Ulster Cup varied from season to season. It often employed a league format, with each club playing each other once and the winner declared as the team with the most points; and sometimes a group basis, with the winners decided by a play-off.

The format over the years was as follows:

Finals results
Winners of the Ulster Cup by season.

Key:

Performance by club

Senior

First Division only

Notes

References

External links
 Ulster Cup Archive at the Irish Football Club Project
Irish League Archive - Ulster Cup

Defunct association football cup competitions in Northern Ireland